Soccer Aid is a British annual (formerly bi-ennial) charity event that has raised over £38 million in aid of UNICEF UK, through ticket sales and donations from the public. The televised event is a friendly-style football match between two teams, England and the Soccer Aid World XI (formerly Rest of the World (ROW) until 2018), composed of celebrities and former professional players representing their countries.

Soccer Aid was initiated in 2006 by Robbie Williams and Jonathan Wilkes. It initially took place every two years, however, from the 2018 edition, it is now held annually. It is produced by Initial and distributed by Endemol Shine Sport, a Dutch company that distributes Dutch Eredivisie coverage. Television coverage began on ITV on 22 May 2006 in a show presented by Ant & Dec. Dermot O'Leary took over as main presenter in 2010.

Event details
The ROW/World XI team is currently winning the head-to-head, with 6 wins to the England team's 5.

On 16 June 2019, the fixture was the first to include female players as part of the squads. In 2020, the match was played behind closed doors due to the COVID-19 pandemic.

Soccer Aid 2006

ITV, 22–27 May 2006

Event schedule
22 May 2006 – Start of the television coverage, presented by Ant and Dec. Rest of the World defeats England in a penalty shoot-out
23 May 2006 – Practice match: England 1–0 England Legends (Craven Cottage, London)
24 May 2006 – Practice match: Rest of the World 3–7 Scotland Legends (Craven Cottage, London)
25 May 2006 – Rest of the World defeats England in a Football Quiz
26 May 2006 – Coaches name starting line-ups for the match
27 May 2006 – Soccer Aid Match: England 2–1 Rest of the World (Old Trafford, Manchester), attendance 71,960
The practice matches were played over 60 minutes, with the Soccer Aid match played over 90 minutes.

The competition was organised on behalf of UNICEF UK with profits from the matches, along with donations and sponsorship, donated to UNICEF programs in Africa, Asia and the Americas.

England beat the Rest Of The World 2–1. Goals from Les Ferdinand and Jonathan Wilkes put England into a two-goal lead but a handball inside the area from David Gray resulted in a penalty, converted by Diego Maradona. Wilkes won the Man of the Match award.

England squad
The England squad was managed by former England national football team manager Terry Venables, assisted by David Geddis and Ted Buxton. The original squad comprised 16 players, with Bryan Robson added later. A handful of the players, notably Angus Deayton, had previous celebrity international experience from the previous month's England v Germany: The Legends match in Reading, which Germany won 4–2. The England squad went into the match with no major injury worries. Their victory over a squad of ex-England internationals from the 1960s to 1990s on Tuesday morning was tempered with defeats to the Rest of the World in a penalty shootout and football quiz.

Celebrities
Robbie Williams (captain)
David Gray
Jamie Theakston
Bradley Walsh
Jonathan Wilkes
Ben Shephard
Ronnie O'Sullivan
Damian Lewis
Angus Deayton
Dean Lennox Kelly

Legends
David Seaman
Tony Adams
Paul Gascoigne
Jamie Redknapp
Les Ferdinand
John Barnes
Bryan Robson
Graeme Le Saux

Rest of the World squad
The Rest of the World squad was managed by Ruud Gullit, with Gus Poyet as his assistant. Captain Gordon Ramsay injured his leg in the early training sessions and was considered doubtful for the match. The original squad of 16 players, which later saw 2 changes, was supplemented by the addition of Diego Maradona during the build-up to the competition. Lothar Matthäus had appeared in the England v Germany: The Legends match the previous month.

The Rest of the World squad was wracked by injuries and withdrawals, and suffered from a lack of players. Desailly, Matthäus, Schmeichel and Ginola all arrived with only 2 or 3 days to spare before the match; Ginola arrived during half time of their warm-up defeat to the Scotland Legends on Wednesday afternoon, and Diego Maradona only joined the squad on the day before the match.

Also, Craig Doyle and Brian McFadden went into the match carrying knocks, which led to management members Ruud Gullit and Gus Poyet coming on as substitutes on Wednesday and in the match itself.

Celebrities
 Gordon Ramsay (captain)
 David Campese
 Patrick Kielty
 Eddie Irvine (withdrew and was replaced by Gareth Thomas)
 Gareth Thomas (replacement for Eddie Irvine)
 Ben Johnson
 Sergei Fedorov
 Brian McFadden
 Alastair Campbell
 Craig Doyle
 Alessandro Nivola
 Michael Greco 
Legends
 Gianfranco Zola
 Marcel Desailly
 David Ginola
 Dunga
 Lothar Matthäus
 Peter Schmeichel
 Diego Maradona
 Ruud Gullit (Player/Manager)
 Gus Poyet (Player/Assistant Manager)

Other notable participants
The match was refereed by Pierluigi Collina, the Italian referee considered by many fans as the best referee of all time.

The match

Soccer Aid 2008

Event schedule
Soccer Aid 2008 was played on 7 September 2008. It was broadcast in the United Kingdom on ITV and presented by Ant & Dec.

Before kick-off Jonathan Ansell sang the footballing anthem "Nessun Dorma", whilst the players were introduced to Sir Geoff Hurst.

England squad
The England squad was coached by Harry Redknapp, with Bryan Robson as his assistant manager.

Celebrities
Ben Shephard
Jamie Theakston
Kyran Bracken
Jonathan Wilkes
Gareth Gates
Tom Felton
Danny Jones
Craig David
Chris Fountain
Angus Deayton
Hugo Speer

Legends
Alan Shearer
Jamie Redknapp
Teddy Sheringham
David Seaman
Graeme Le Saux
Des Walker

Rest of the World squad
The Rest Of The World squad was coached by Kenny Dalglish, with Ian Rush as player-assistant manager.

Celebrities
 Gordon Ramsay
 Brian Lara
 Nicky Byrne
 Kenny Logan
 Patrick Kielty
 Alastair Campbell
 Gethin Jones
 Rodrigo Santoro
 Santiago Cabrera
 Gilles Marini
 Brian McFadden
 Jesse Metcalfe (withdrawn)
Legends
 Franco Baresi
 Jaap Stam
 Paolo Di Canio
 Romário
 Luís Figo
 Cláudio Taffarel (replacement for Peter Schmeichel)
 Ian Rush
 Peter Schmeichel (withdrew and was replaced by Cláudio Taffarel)

Other notable participants 
The referee at the start of the match was Pierluigi Collina, who also refereed the previous match in 2006 and is regarded as the best referee of all time. However, after Collina was injured in the first half he was replaced by Scottish referee Hugh Dallas. The process of two professional referees overseeing one half of the match each has since been maintained in subsequent series.

The match

Soccer Aid 2010

Soccer Aid 2010 was played on 6 June 2010. It was broadcast in the United Kingdom on ITV and presented by Dermot O'Leary.

England squad
Celebrities
Robbie Williams (captain)
Paddy McGuinness
Bradley Walsh
Jamie Theakston
Ricky Hatton
Damian Lewis
Olly Murs
Jonathan Wilkes
Dominic Cooper
Ralf Little
Rupert Penry-Jones (injured)
Danny Cipriani (injured)
Ben Shephard

Legends
David Seaman
Alan Shearer
Teddy Sheringham
Jamie Redknapp
Martin Keown
Nicky Butt
Manager: Harry Redknapp
Assistant manager: James Corden
Coach: Bryan Robson

Rest of the World squad
Celebrities
 Michael Sheen (captain)
 James Kyson
 Gordon Ramsay
 Brian Lara
 Patrick Kielty
 Shane Filan
 Nicky Byrne
 Mike Myers
 Joe Calzaghe
 Gethin Jones
 Woody Harrelson
 Ronan Keating (withdrawn)
 Simon Baker

Legends
 Jens Lehmann
 Henrik Larsson
 Zinedine Zidane
 Ryan Giggs
 Luís Figo
 Sami Hyypiä (replacement for Paolo Maldini)
 Paolo Maldini (withdrew and was replaced by Sami Hyypiä)
Manager:  Kenny Dalglish
Coaches:  Ian Rush and  Eric Harrison
Referee: Pierluigi Collina (replaced at half time by Mark Clattenburg)

The match

Soccer Aid 2012

Soccer Aid 2012 was played on 27 May 2012, as something of a precursor to UEFA Euro 2012 and the 2012 Summer Olympics. It was broadcast in the United Kingdom on ITV and presented by Dermot O'Leary. Cat Deeley presented the backstage build up show before the main event.

England squad
Celebrities
Robbie Williams
Paddy McGuinness
Marvin Humes
Jamie Theakston
Aston Merrygold
John Bishop
Olly Murs
Jonathan Wilkes (Captain)
Jason Isaacs
Mark Owen

Legends
David Seaman
Des Walker
Teddy Sheringham
Kevin Phillips*
Martin Keown
Graeme Le Saux

Coaching Staff
Manager: Sam Allardyce
Assistant manager: Peter Reid
Coach: Bradley Walsh

Rest of the World squad
Celebrities
 Michael Sheen (captain)
 Will Ferrell
 Gordon Ramsay
 Gerard Butler
 Patrick Kielty
 James McAvoy
 Serge Pizzorno
 Mike Myers
 Joe Calzaghe
 Edward Norton
 Woody Harrelson

Legends
 Edwin van der Sar
 Jaap Stam
 Clarence Seedorf
 Roy Keane
 Hernán Crespo
 Freddie Ljungberg
 Ruud van Nistelrooy (withdrawn)
Coaching Staff
Manager: Kenny Dalglish
Assistant manager: Ian Rush
Coach: Eric Harrison

The match

Soccer Aid 2014

The 2014 match was played at Old Trafford on 8 June 2014.

The main match was hosted by Dermot O'Leary with Kirsty Gallacher, and Cat Deeley presented the backstage build-up show before the main event. Caroline Flack presented from the BT Tower in London. Match commentators were Sam Matterface and Graham Taylor, and Sol Campbell was a studio guest.	

By full-time, the total raised for UNICEF was £4,233,019.

England squad
Celebrities
Danny Jones
Stephen Moyer
Jack Whitehall
Mark Owen
Olly Murs
Paddy McGuinness
Jonathan Wilkes (captain)
Jamie Theakston
Ben Shephard
John Bishop
Marvin Humes
Dominic Cooper
Matt Smith (withdrawn injured)

Legends
Jamie Redknapp
Jamie Carragher
Paul Ince (withdrawn)
Des Walker
David Seaman
Teddy Sheringham (withdrawn injured)
Matt Le Tissier
Kevin Phillips (replacement for Sheringham)

Coaching Staff
Manager: Sam Allardyce
Assistant manager: Robbie Williams (injured)
Coach: Peter Reid
Coach: Bradley Walsh

Rest of the World squad
Celebrities
 Michael Sheen (captain)
 James McAvoy
 Gordon Ramsay
 Kevin Bridges
 Nicky Byrne
 Patrick Kielty
 Adam Richman
 Jeremy Renner
 Santiago Cabrera
 Sam Worthington
 Mark Salling
 Martin Compston
Legends
 Edwin van der Sar
 Jaap Stam
 Edgar Davids
 Alessandro Del Piero
 Clarence Seedorf
 Andriy Shevchenko

Coaching Staff
Manager:  José Mourinho
Assistant manager:  Rui Faria
Coach:  José Morais
Coach:  Vic Bettinelli

The match

Soccer Aid 2016

The 2016 match was played at Old Trafford on Sunday, 5 June. The main match was hosted by Dermot O'Leary and Kirsty Gallacher, with commentary from Clive Tyldesley and Chris Kamara.

England squad
Celebrities
Louis Tomlinson
Olly Murs
Paddy McGuinness
Damian Lewis
Ben Shephard
Jonathan Wilkes (Captain)
Jack Whitehall
Jamie Theakston (Goalkeeper)
John Bishop
Mark Wright 
Marvin Humes
Danny Jones (Withdrawn due to injury)

Legends
Jamie Carragher
Robbie Fowler 
Phil Neville 
Sol Campbell 
Jermain Defoe
Danny Murphy
Kieron Dyer
David Seaman (Goalkeeper)

Coaching Staff
Manager:  Sam Allardyce and  José Mourinho
Assistant manager: Robbie Williams (Player-assistant manager)
Coach: Bradley Walsh

Rest of the World squad
Celebrities
 Gordon Ramsay (Withdrawn due to injury)
 Nicky Byrne 
 Niall Horan
 Serge Pizzorno
 AP McCoy
 Michael Sheen (Captain)
 Matthew Morrison
 Shayne Ward
 Iwan Rheon
 Sean Fletcher
 Thom Evans
 Rickie Haywood Williams 
 Patrick Kielty (Goalkeeper)
 Gareth Thomas (Replacement for Gordon Ramsay)

Legends
 Ronaldinho
 Cafu 
 Jaap Stam 
 Samuel Eto'o (withdrawn due to injury)
 Fabio Cannavaro 
 Dimitar Berbatov
 Edgar Davids
 Dida (Goalkeeper)

Coaching Staff
Manager:  Claudio Ranieri
Assistant Manager:  Niall Horan (Player-assistant manager)

The match

Soccer Aid 2018
The 2018 match was played at Old Trafford on Sunday 10 June. The main match was hosted by Dermot O'Leary and Kirsty Gallacher, with commentary from Clive Tyldesley and Robbie Savage.

England squad
Celebrities
 Olly Murs (Captain)
 Mo Farah
 Joe Wicks
 Mark Wright
 Paddy McGuinness
 Damian Lewis
 Myles Stephenson
 David Harewood
 Andrew Flintoff
 Lee Mack
 Blake Harrison
 Jack O'Connell
 Jeremy Lynch
 Robbie Williams (withdrawn due to injury)
 Billy Wingrove (withdrawn due to injury)
 Ben Shephard (withdrawn due to injury)
Legends
 David Seaman
 Wes Brown
 Phil Neville
 Jamie Redknapp
 Danny Murphy
 Michael Owen
 Darren Bent
 Darius Vassell
 Robbie Fowler (withdrawn due to injury)
Coaching Staff
Manager:  Sam Allardyce
Assistant Manager:  Bradley Walsh
Coach:  Robbie Williams
Coach:  John Bishop
Coach:  Ben Shephard

Soccer Aid World XI squad
Celebrities
 Usain Bolt (Captain)
 Gordon Ramsay
 Brendan Cole
 Kevin Pietersen
 Dan Carter
 Ashley Fongho
 Martin Compston
 Ioan Gruffudd
 Nicky Byrne
 Danny O'Carroll
 Hayden Christensen

Legends
 Edwin van der Sar
 Jaap Stam
 Clarence Seedorf
 Yaya Touré
 Robert Pires
 Juan Sebastián Verón
 Claude Makélélé
 Patrick Kluivert
 Eric Cantona
 Robbie Keane
Coaching Staff
Manager:  Harry Redknapp and  Eric Cantona
Coach:  Michael Sheen

The Match

Soccer Aid 2019
The 2019 match was played at Stamford Bridge. The main match is hosted by Dermot O'Leary and Kirsty Gallacher, with commentary from Clive Tyldesley and Graeme Le Saux. The game was opened by poet Hussain Manawer with his poem Game of Hearts. The 2019 edition was the first to feature female players. As in 2018, the referee was Mark Clattenburg.

At half-time British singer and actress Rita Ora performed new song "Ritual" with British DJ Jonas Blue and Dutch DJ Tiësto, the first time a musician has performed at Soccer Aid. American actor and filmmaker Tom Hanks kicked-off this year's Soccer Aid.

England squad

Celebrities
 Mo Farah (Captain) 
 Jeremy Lynch 
 Mark Wright 
 Joe Wicks 
 Ben Shephard
 David Harewood 
 Marvin Humes 
 Danny Jones 
 Ant Middleton 
 Lee Mack 
 Sam Claflin  
 Alan Sexton (competition winner) 
Legends
 David Seaman 
 Jamie Carragher 
 Glen Johnson 
 John Terry
 Jamie Redknapp
 Joe Cole
 Katie Chapman
 Michael Owen
 Rachel Yankey
 Casey Stoney (withdrawn due to injury)
Coaching Staff
 Manager: Sam Allardyce
 Assistant Manager: Susanna Reid
 Coach: Bradley Walsh

Soccer Aid World XI squad
Celebrities
  Usain Bolt (Captain)
  Billy Wingrove
  Kem Cetinay
  Niall Horan
  Martin Compston
  Danny O'Carroll
  Jack Savoretti
  Roman Kemp
  Locksmith
  Nicky Byrne
  James McAvoy
Legends
  Júlio César
  Ricardo Carvalho
  Roberto Carlos
  Michael Essien
  Robert Pires
  Rosana
  Francielle
  Didier Drogba
  Robbie Keane
  Eric Cantona
Coaching Staff
 Manager:  Harry Redknapp
 Assistant Manager:  Piers Morgan

The Match

Soccer Aid 2020
The 2020 match was scheduled to be played at Old Trafford on 6 June 2020. With the outbreak of COVID-19, the match was postponed with a rescheduled date of 6 September 2020. This Soccer Aid 2020 match was played behind closed doors.

England squad

Celebrities
 Olly Murs (captain)
 Joe Wicks 
 Joel Dommett
 Marvin Humes
 Russell Howard (withdrawn)
 Danny Jones
 Mark Wright 
 Lee Mack
 Tom Davis
 James Bay
 John Bishop
 Alfie Allen
 Yung Filly
 Chunkz
 Paddy McGuinness
 Liv Cooke (Withdrew due to injury)

Legends
 David James 
 Wes Brown
 Ashley Cole
 John Terry
 Katie Chapman
 Joe Cole
 Gareth Barry
 Kelly Smith
 Andy Cole
 Casey Stoney (Withdrew due to injury)
 Michael Owen (Withdrew due to injury)
 Emile Heskey

Coaching Staff
 Manager: Wayne Rooney, Sam Allardyce and Bradley Walsh

Soccer Aid World XI squad
Celebrities
  Mo Gilligan (captain)
  Kem Cetinay
  Jason Manford
  Dave
  Chelcee Grimes
  Iain Stirling
  Jeremy Lynch 
  Dermot Kennedy 
  Roman Kemp
  Ore Oduba
  Locksmith
  Serge Pizzorno
  Billy Wingrove (Withdrew due to injury)

Legends
  Shay Given
  Patrice Evra
  Mikael Silvestre
  Jaap Stam (withdrew)
  Yaya Touré (removed from squad)
  Darren Fletcher
  Claude Makélélé
  Michael Essien
  Robbie Keane
  Lianne Sanderson
  Julie Fleeting
  Roberto Carlos (withdrew)
Coaching Staff
 Manager:  Harry Redknapp,  Bryan Robson and  Vic Bettinelli

Note: Yaya Touré was dropped from the event after sending inappropriate messages in a squad WhatsApp group.

The Match

Soccer Aid 2021
The 2021 match was held at the City of Manchester Stadium on 4 September 2021. Lee Mack switched teams to the Rest of the World squad, due to his Irish heritage.

England squad

Celebrities
 Olly Murs (captain)
 Liv Cooke (withdrew due to illness)
 James Arthur
 Paddy McGuinness (withdrew due to an injury)
 Chunkz
 Mark Wright
 Joel Dommett
 Mo Farah
 Aitch
 Max Whitlock
 James Bay
 Harriet Pavlou
 Stephen Mulhern
Legends
 David James
 Gary Neville
 Jamie Carragher
 Paul Scholes
 Jamie Redknapp
 Fara Williams
 Shaun Wright-Phillips
 Joe Cole
 Wayne Rooney
 Kelly Smith

Coaching Staff
 Manager:  Sven-Göran Eriksson
 Coaches: David Seaman, Micah Richards and Robbie Williams

Soccer Aid World XI squad
Celebrities
  Usain Bolt (captain)
  Kem Cetinay
  Roman Kemp (withdrew due to illness)
  Ore Oduba
  Tom Grennan
  Martin Compston
  Dermot Kennedy
  Yungblud
  Chelcee Grimes
  Big Zuu
  Lee Mack

Legends
  Shay Given
  Roberto Carlos
  Patrice Evra
  Pablo Zabaleta
  Ingrid Moe Wold
  Wes Morgan
  Nigel de Jong
  Clarence Seedorf
  Darren Fletcher
  Robbie Keane (replacement for Rivaldo)
  Rivaldo (withdrawn)
  Julie Fleeting

Coaching Staff
 Manager:  Harry Redknapp
 Player-Assistant Manager:  Robbie Keane
 Tea Lady:  Judy Murray

Other staff 

 UNICEF Goodwill Ambassador:  David Beckham

Match

Soccer Aid 2022
The 2022 match was held at the London Stadium, home of West Ham United, on 12 June 2022.

England squad

Celebrities
 Liam Payne (captain)
 Lucien Laviscount (withdraw)
 Tom Grennan
 Chunkz
 Alex Brooker
 Damian Lewis
 Mo Farah
 Mark Wright
 David Harewood
 Aitch
 Russell Howard

Legends
 David James
 Gary Neville
 Jamie Carragher
 Anita Asante
 Fara Williams
 Joe Cole
 Mark Noble
 Stewart Downing
 Teddy Sheringham
 Eniola Aluko

Coaching Staff
 Manager: Harry Redknapp and Emma Hayes
 Coach: David Seaman and Vicky McClure

Soccer Aid World XI squad
Celebrities
  Usain Bolt (captain)
  Martin Compston
  Mo Gilligan
  Chelcee Grimes
  Steven Bartlett
  Lee Mack
  Noah Beck
  Munya Chawawa
  Kem Cetinay
  Mark Strong
  Tom Stoltman

Legends
  Petr Cech
  Patrice Evra
  Cafu
  Roberto Carlos
  Andrea Pirlo (withdrew)
  Heather O'Reilly
  Carli Lloyd
  Andriy Shevchenko
  Dimitar Berbatov
  Robbie Keane

Coaching Staff
 Manager:  Arsene Wenger
 Player/Coach:  Robbie Keane
 Coach:  Idris Elba and  Graham Stack

Match

Soccer Aid 2023
The 2023 match will be held at Old Trafford on 11 June 2023. Jill Scott is set to become the first female to captain a team in any edition.

England squad

Celebrities
 Paddy McGuinness 
 Bugzy Malone
 Tom Grennan
 Mo Farah
 Alex Brooker
 Chunkz
 Joel Corry
 Scarlette Douglas

Legends
 David James
 Gary Neville
 Gary Cahill
 Jill Scott (captain)
 Karen Carney
 Jack Wilshere
 Paul Scholes
 Eniola Aluko
 Jermain Defoe

Coaching Staff
 Manager: Emma Hayes, Vicky McClure

Soccer Aid World XI squad
Celebrities
  Usain Bolt (captain)
  Lee Mack
  Steven Bartlett
  Kem Cetinay
Legends
Coaching Staff
 Manager:  Robbie Keane

Statistics 
As of the 2022 match.

Top Scorers

Most Appearances

Notes

See also
World XI

References

External links

Soccer Aid at UNICEF.org.uk

UNICEF
2006 British television series debuts
2010s British television series
2020s British television series
2006 in British television
2008 in British television
2010 in British television
2012 in British television
2014 in British television
2016 in British television
2018 in British television
2019 in British television
2020 in British television
2021 in British television
2022 in British television
Charity events in the United Kingdom
ITV (TV network) original programming
Recurring events established in 2006
Recurring sporting events established in 2006
Charity football matches